Algonquin Highlands is a township located in Haliburton County, Ontario, Canada. It has a population of 2,351. The northeastern section of the township is included in Algonquin Provincial Park.

The township was formed through the amalgamation of Stanhope and Sherborne et al. townships, the latter of which included McClintock, Livingstone, Lawrence and Nightingale. It was thereafter briefly known as the Township of Sherborne, Stanhope, McClintock, Livingstone, Lawrence and Nightingale until it was renamed to its current name in March 2001.

A satellite municipal office is located in Dorset, the main street of which straddles the border of Algonquin Highlands to the east and Lake of Bays to the west.

Communities
The largest community in the Municipality of Algonquin Highlands is Dorset, Ontario although this community is actually split with Lake of Bays, Ontario.

Geography
Located in Algonquin Provincial Park, the area is characterized by uplands and dense transitional forestation. It rests on a portion of the Canadian Shield.

Climate
Algonquin Highlands experiences a humid continental climate, with it being more cool due to the higher elevation.

Demographics 

According to the Canada 2006 Census:
Mother tongue:
 English as first language: 92.1%
 French as first language: 1.3%
 English and French as first language: 0%
 Other as first language: 6.6%

See also
 List of municipalities in Ontario
List of townships in Ontario

References

External links

Township municipalities in Ontario
Lower-tier municipalities in Ontario
Municipalities in Haliburton County